Cynthia Mascitto (born 4 October 1992) is an Italian short track speed skater. She competed in the 2018 Winter Olympics.

References

External links

1992 births
Living people
Italian female short track speed skaters
Olympic short track speed skaters of Italy
Short track speed skaters at the 2018 Winter Olympics
Short track speed skaters at the 2022 Winter Olympics
World Short Track Speed Skating Championships medalists
Speed skaters from Montreal
21st-century Italian women